Martha N. Brookings (born November 16, 1881) was an American Republican politician from Gloucester, Massachusetts. She represented the 16th Essex district in the Massachusetts House of Representatives from 1927 to 1930.

See also
 1927-1928 Massachusetts legislature
 1929-1930 Massachusetts legislature

References

1881 births
Year of death missing
Members of the Massachusetts House of Representatives
Women state legislators in Massachusetts
20th-century American women politicians
20th-century American politicians
People from Gloucester, Massachusetts